The 1987 West Virginia Mountaineers football team represented West Virginia University in the 1987 NCAA Division I-A football season. It was the Mountaineers' 95th overall season and they competed as a Division I-A Independent. The team was led by head coach Don Nehlen, in his eighth year, and played their home games at Mountaineer Field in Morgantown, West Virginia. They finished the season with a record of six wins and six losses (6–6 overall), and with a loss against Oklahoma State in the 1987 Sun Bowl.

Schedule

References

West Virginia
West Virginia Mountaineers football seasons
West Virginia Mountaineers football